Csaba Gyüre (born in Kisvárda, Hungary on May 19 , 1965) is a Hungarian lawyer and politician. He is a member of parliament in the National Assembly of Hungary (Országgyűlés) representing Szabolcs-Szatmár-Bereg County.

Early life and career 
He graduated from the György Bessenyei Grammar School in Kisvárda in 1983. Between 1984 and 1989 he was a full-time student at the Faculty of Law of Eötvös Loránd University. He graduated in law in February 1989. Already during his university years, he lived an active political life, participating in opposition events. In 1988, he participated in the founding of the Hungarian Democratic Forum organization.. After graduating, he worked in public administration in various positions. He served as a lawyer at a law firm between January 3, 1993 to 1995. In 1996, he graduated from the Faculty of Arts of the Lajos Kossuth University with a degree in history.

Career 
He was a member of the Hungarian Justice and Life Party since 2001. In the parliamentary elections of 2002, he ran as a candidate Hungarian Justice and Life Party in Nyíregyháza. He was expelled from the party after the election. He joined the Jobbik in 2003, and has been a member of the party since 2004. In 2014, he entered the National Assembly of Hungary from the party's national list, but did not win a seat in the 2018 election, after the resignation of Mrs. Lóránt Hegedűs, Gyüre was appointed into the National Assembly. He took his oath of office on April 1, 2019.

References 

Living people
1965 births
20th-century Hungarian lawyers
Hungarian politicians
21st-century Hungarian politicians
Jobbik politicians
Members of the National Assembly of Hungary (2018–2022)
Members of the National Assembly of Hungary (2014–2018)
People from Kisvárda